Streatfeild Lake is a lake in Kenora District, Ontario, Canada. It is the source of the Streatfeild River. The river lies in the Hudson Bay Lowlands.

See also
List of lakes in Ontario

References

Lakes of Kenora District